Jean-Julien Rojer and Horia Tecău are the defending champions, but lost to Vasek Pospisil and Jack Sock in the semifinals.

Pospisil and Sock went on to win the title, defeating Daniel Nestor and Édouard Roger-Vasselin in the final 3–6, 6–3, [10–6].

Seeds

Draw

Draw

Qualifying

Seeds

Qualifiers
  Julian Knowle /  Oliver Marach

Qualifying draw

References
 Main Draw

Open Mens Doubles